The Smith & Wesson Model 640 revolver is a 5-shot snubnosed revolver that is chambered in either .38 Special or .357 Magnum caliber introduced in 1990. Like other "J-frame" Smith & Wesson revolvers, it has a swing-out cylinder, but this model features a concealed hammer, and is part of the Centennial line.

History
The first model was chambered in .38 Special and fitted with a standard barrel of 1-7/8 inch length. The second model had a slightly heavier and longer barrel of 2-1/8 inch length.  The gun was constructed entirely of stainless steel. In 1995 the model 642 was introduced which was made in aluminium and designated "airweight".

A 3" barreled version was offered until 1993, when it was dropped from production.  That same year S&W introduced the Model 940, similar in appearance, but chambered in 9mm Luger.  In 1996 the 940 was dropped and S&W began chambering the 640 in .357 Magnum.  Because of the power of the .357 magnum cartridge, the frame is strengthened just in front of the cylinder release on those models.

In 2001 a Scandium framed version was introduced in .357 Magnum designated as the Model 340.  This revolver weighed 10.9 ounces.

9/11 Revolver
A Model 640 was carried by New York City police officer Walter Weaver when he entered the World Trade Center North Tower during the September 11, 2001 attacks. Weaver was on the 6th floor attempting to free people trapped in an elevator when the tower collapsed. Officer Weaver's remains were never found but his revolver was recovered from the site, missing the grips but intact. His family donated it to the NRA National Firearms Museum in Fairfax, Virginia and displayed with a photo of Weaver.

Users
  -New York City Police Department (off-duty/backup)

References 

Smith & Wesson revolvers
.357 Magnum firearms
.38 Special firearms